The Bloody Brood is a 1959 Canadian thriller film directed by Julian Roffman.

Premise
A man begins to investigate on his own the death of his brother, who died from eating a hamburger laced with ground glass. With the police case stalled because of ineptness, the man's own investigation leads him toward a beatnik hang-out frequented by Nico (Peter Falk), a shady character who supplies drugs to the patrons and philosophizes about the ills of the world.

Cast

Production
The production interiors were lensed at the Community Theatre, on Woodbine Avenue, in Toronto, a cinema that had been earlier retrofitted for use as a TV studio after 1955. Ralph Foster and Julian Roffman founded Meridian Studios in 1954.

Reception

Author and film critic Leonard Maltin awarded the film two out of four stars, calling it "[A] laughable, thoroughly cynical depiction of the Beat Generation."

References

External links 

1959 films
1959 crime drama films
Canadian detective films
English-language Canadian films
1950s English-language films
Canadian black-and-white films
Canadian crime thriller films
Films shot in Toronto
Films directed by Julian Roffman
1950s Canadian films